Oak City Christian Church, also known as Oak City Christian Church, Disciples of Christ, is a historic Christian Church (Disciples of Christ) (DOC) church located at 310 W. Commerce Street in Oak City, Martin County, North Carolina. It was built in 1921, and is a one-story, frame, weatherboarded, Gothic Revival style building.  It features five lancet-arched stained-glass windows, a two-story bell tower with a broached hexagonal roof, and a hip-roofed porch.

It was added to the National Register of Historic Places in 2005.

References

Christian Church (Disciples of Christ) congregations
Churches on the National Register of Historic Places in North Carolina
Gothic Revival church buildings in North Carolina
Churches completed in 1921
20th-century United Church of Christ church buildings
Churches in Martin County, North Carolina
National Register of Historic Places in Martin County, North Carolina